The following is the discography of Karen Clark Sheard.

Albums

Studio and live albums

Compilation albums

Singles

As a lead artist

As featured artist

Promotional singles

Other charted songs

Other
This section documents Karen Clark Sheard's featured solo appearances. For The Clark Sisters' appearances, visit this section.

References

Discographies of American artists
Christian music discographies